This is a list of National Hockey League (NHL) players who have played at least one game in the NHL from 1917 to present and have a last name that starts with "T".

List updated as of the 2018–19 NHL season.

Ta

 Rick Tabaracci
 Jeff Taffe
 John Taft
 Peter Taglianetti
 Kari Takko
 Dean Talafous
 Ron Talakoski
 Cam Talbot
 Jean-Guy Talbot
 Maxime Talbot
 Barry Tallackson
 Rob Tallas
 Henrik Tallinder
 Dale Tallon
 Jeff Tambellini
 Steve Tambellini
 Chris Tamer
 Dave Tanabe
 Chris Tancill
 Brandon Tanev
 Christopher Tanev
 Eric Tangradi
 Alex Tanguay
 Christian Tanguay
 Don Tannahill
 John Tanner
 Tony Tanti
 Matt Taormina
 Brad Tapper
 Vladimir Tarasenko
 Daniil Tarasov
 Marc Tardif
 Patrice Tardif
 Iiro Tarkki
 Nick Tarnasky
 Dick Tarnstrom
 Tomas Tatar
 Mikhail Tatarinov
 Dave Tataryn
 Spence Tatchell
 Petr Taticek
 Bill Taugher
 John Tavares
 Billy Taylor (born 1919)
 Billy Taylor (born 1942)
 Bob Taylor
 Bobby Taylor
 Chris Taylor
 Daniel Taylor
 Dave Taylor
 Harry Taylor
 Mark Taylor
 Ralph Taylor
 Ted Taylor
 Tim Taylor

Te

 Alan "Skip" Teal
 Jeff Teal
 Vic "Skeeter" Teal
 Greg Tebbutt
 Mattias Tedenby
 Mikael Tellqvist
 Petr Tenkrat
 Matt Tennyson
 Harvey Teno
 Joey Tenute
 Stephen Tepper
 Teuvo Teravainen
 Paul Terbenche
 Chris Terreri
 Greg Terrion
 Bill Terry
 Chris Terry
 Troy Terry
 Dmitri Tertyshny
 Orval Tessier
 Joey Tetarenko
 Colten Teubert
 Josh Teves
 Alexandre Texier
 Alexei Tezikov

Th

 Ryan Thang
 Greg Theberge
 Mats Thelin
 Michael Thelven
 Jose Theodore
 Shea Theodore
 Chris Therien
 Gaston Therrien
 Gilles Thibaudeau
 Jocelyn Thibault
 Larry Thibeault
 Brad Thiessen
 Leo Thiffault
 Ben Thomas
 Bill Thomas
 Christian Thomas
 Cy Thomas
 Reg Thomas
 Robert Thomas
 Scott Thomas
 Steve Thomas
 Tim Thomas
 Wayne Thomas
 Dave Thomlinson
 Brent Thompson
 Cecil "Tiny" Thompson
 Cliff Thompson
 Errol Thompson
 Kenneth Thompson
 Logan Thompson
 Nate Thompson
 Paul Thompson (born 1906)
 Paul Thompson (born 1988)
 Rocky Thompson
 Tage Thompson
 Tyce Thompson
 Bill Thoms
 Ben Thomson
 Bill Thomson
 Floyd Thomson
 Jim Thomson
 Jimmy Thomson
 Rhys Thomson
 Chris Thorburn
 Patrick Thoresen
 Tom Thornbury
 Joe Thornton
 Scott Thornton
 Shawn Thornton
 Joe Thorsteinson
 Andreas Thuresson
 Fred Thurier
 Calvin Thurkauf
 Tom Thurlby
 Mario Thyer

Ti–Tl

 Billy Tibbetts
 Milan Tichy
 Alec Tidey
 Chris Tierney
 Viktor Tikhonov
 Esa Tikkanen
 Brad Tiley
 Tom Tilley
 Mattias Timander
 Dmytro Timashov
 Ray Timgren
 Conor Timmins
 Scott Timmins
 Jussi Timonen
 Kimmo Timonen
 Jarred Tinordi
 Mark Tinordi
 Dave Tippett
 Owen Tippett
 Morris Titanic
 German Titov
 Daniel Tjarnqvist
 Mathias Tjarnqvist
 Brady Tkachuk
 Keith Tkachuk
 Matthew Tkachuk
 Daniel Tkaczuk
 Walt Tkaczuk
 Jiri Tlusty

To

 Mike Toal
 Ryan Tobler
 Rick Tocchet
 Kevin Todd
 Devon Toews
 Jonathan Toews
 Tyler Toffoli
 Hannu Toivonen
 Dustin Tokarski
 Sergey Tolchinsky
 Ole-Kristian Tollefsen
 Denis Tolpeko
 Eeli Tolvanen
 Glenn Tomalty
 Mike Tomlak
 Dave Tomlinson
 Kirk Tomlinson
 Jeff Toms
 Jack Tomson
 John Tonelli
 Dominic Toninato
 Tim Tookey
 Sean Toomey
 Jordin Tootoo
 Shayne Toporowski
 Jerry Toppazzini
 Zellio Toppazzini
 Mike Torchia
 Josh Tordjman
 Pavel Torgayev
 Jari Torkki
 Antti Tormanen
 Raffi Torres
 Vesa Toskala
 Bill Touhey
 Jack Toupin
 Art Townsend
 Graeme Townshend

Tr–Ts

 Larry Trader
 Wes "Bucko" Trainor
 Bobby Trapp
 Doug Trapp
 Percy Traub
 Patrick Traverse
 Dan Trebil
 Brock Tredway
 Andrei Trefilov
 Brent Tremblay
 Gilles Tremblay
 J. C. Tremblay
 Marcel Tremblay
 Mario Tremblay
 Nils Tremblay
 Vincent Tremblay
 Yannick Tremblay
 Yakov Trenin
 Pascal Trepanier
 Niklas Treutle
 Tim Trimper
 John Tripp
 Pavel Trnka
 Vincent Trocheck
 Corey Tropp
 Zach Trotman
 Brock Trotter
 Bryan Trottier
 Dave Trottier
 Guy Trottier
 Rocky Trottier
 Jacob Trouba
 Jean-Guy Trudel
 Louis Trudel
 Rene Trudell
 Alexander True
 Nikita Tryamkin
 Nikos Tselios
 Nikolai Tsulygin
 Denis Tsygurov
 Vladimir Tsyplakov

Tu–Ty

 Alex Tuch
 Darcy Tucker
 John Tucker
 Ted Tucker
 Connie Tudin
 Rob Tudor
 Al Tuer
 Ron Tugnutt
 Lauri Tukonen
 Marko Tuomainen
 Marty Turco
 Alfie Turcotte
 Darren Turcotte
 Roman Turek
 Dominic Turgeon
 Pierre Turgeon
 Sylvain Turgeon
 Gordon Turlick
 Ian Turnbull
 Perry Turnbull
 Randy Turnbull
 Travis Turnbull
 Bob Turner
 Brad Turner
 Dean Turner
 Joe Turner
 Kyle Turris
 Norman Tustin
 Aud Tuten
 Brian Tutt
 Steve Tuttle
 Tony Tuzzolino
 Oleg Tverdovsky
 Roman Tvrdon
 Carsen Twarynski
 Tony Twist
 T. J. Tynan
 Dana Tyrell
 Fedor Tyutin

See also
 hockeydb.com NHL Player List - T

Players